Grenadines is an administrative parish of Saint Vincent and the Grenadines, comprising the islands of the Grenadines other than those belonging to Grenada. The capital is Port Elizabeth.

 Area: 44 km² (17 mi²)
 Population: 9,200 (2000 estimates)

Islands
The parish includes the northern Grenadine Islands:

 All Awash Island
 Baliceaux (Baliceaux Island)
 Battowia (Battowia Island)
 Bequia
 Canouan (Canouan Island)
 Catholic Island
 Church Cay
 Dove Cay
 L'Islot
 Mayreau
 Mustique
 Petit Canouan
 Petit Cay
 Petit Mustique
 Petit Nevis
 Petit Saint Vincent
 Pigeon Island
 Prune Island (Palm Island)
 Quatre (Isle à Quatre)
 Rabbit Island
 Red Island
 Saint Elairs Cay
 Sand Cay
 Savan (Savan Island)
 The Pillories (Les Piloris)
 Tobago Cays
 Union Island

Populated places 
The following populated places are located in the parish of Grenadine:

References

External links

 Parishes of Saint Vincent and the Grenadines, Statoids.com

Parishes of Saint Vincent and the Grenadines